The Khatyngnakh (Xatıŋnaax), or Khatynnakh (Хатыннах), is a river in the Sakha Republic (Yakutia), Russia. It is the longest tributary of the Uyandina.

The Khatyngnakh is fed by snow and rain. It flows north of the Arctic Circle, across desolate territories of the Aby District.

Course
The Khatyngnakh is a left tributary of the Uyandina.

The Khatyngnakh flows meandering roughly southwards across a vast floodplain in the northern sector of the Aby Lowland, where there are innumerable lakes and swamps. Finally the river joins the left bank of the Uyandina  from its mouth in the Indigirka.

Tributaries  
The river is frozen between the beginning of October and the beginning of June.

See also
List of rivers of Russia

References

External links 
Fishing & Tourism in Yakutia

Rivers of the Sakha Republic
East Siberian Lowland
Indigirka basin